Man Tera Tan Mera is a 1971 Bollywood drama film directed by B. R. Ishara. The film stars Anil Dhawan, Rehana Sultan, Shatrughan Sinha.

Cast
Anil Dhawan as Deepak
Rehana Sultan as Jyoti
Shatrughan Sinha as Rajan

Music
All songs were written by Naqsh Lyallpuri.

External links
 

1971 films
Films scored by Sapan-Jagmohan
1970s Hindi-language films
1971 drama films